, stylized as jizue and pronounced "Jizu", is a Japanese instrumental jazz-fusion band from Kyoto. The band's name is taken from an alternate spelling of French soccer star Zinedine Zidane’s nickname "Zizou".

History
Jizue was formed in 2006 by guitarist Norimasa Inoue, bassist Tsuyoshi "Gou" Yamada, and  drummer Shin Kogawa. Piano player Kataki "Kie" Nozomiyo  joined the following year. Their music was influenced by post-rock, together with jazz, which led to their present fusion sound.
They have performed at large music festivals such as Fuji Rock.

In 2017, they were signed to Victor Entertainment.

Band members
Current
 Tsuyoshi "Gou" Yamada - bass guitar
 Noriyuki Inoue - guitar
 Katagi "Kie" Nozomiyo - piano

Past
 Shin Kokawa - drums

Discography
Studio albums
 Bookshelf (2010)
 Novel (2012)
 Journal (2013)
 Shiori (2014)
 Story (2016)
 Room (2018)
 Gallery (2019)
 Seeds (2020)
 Garden (2021)

EPs
 Grassroots (2017)

Live albums
 Jizue Orchestra Live at Kyoto Concert Hall 2019.10.19 (2020)

Soundtracks
 Stars Align Original Soundtrack (Hoshiai no Sora) (2019)

Singles
 "Chaser/Sun" (2011)
 "Dance" (2013)
 "Christmas Comes to Our Place" (2015 - Split with Fox Capture Plan)
 "惑青 / 真黒" (2015 - feat. Shing02)
 "I Miss You" (2017)
 "P.D.A." (2019)
 "Kaname (feat. Shota Aratani (Yonawo))" (2021)
 "Bask" (2021)
 "Arukas" (2021)

References

External links
 
 Bud Music official website

Japanese musical groups
Musical groups from Kyoto Prefecture
Musical groups established in 2006
Japanese rock music groups
Japanese jazz ensembles